Sayyid Badr Albusaidi (born 1960) is the Foreign Minister of Oman. Sayyid Badr has represented Oman in regional and international meetings, which include the United Nations.

Personal life

Early life 
Sayyid Badr was born in Muscat on 30 May 1960. He is the second son of Sayyid Hamad Albusaidi, who worked under Sultan Said bin Taimur and Sultan Qaboos bin Said.

In the 1960s, his father Sayyid Hamad was the private secretary of Sultan Said bin Taimur, who lived exclusively in Salalah, during which Sayyid Hamad, along with his family, lived in the Salalah palace compounds.

In 1970 Sultan Qaboos succeeded his father and made his residence in Muscat. Sayyid Hamad moved the family to Muscat in order to assist the new sultan in the development of a modern administration; he held the position of Minister of Diwan (Court) Affairs, managing the relations between the Sultan and the citizens, until 1986. From 1986 until his death in 2002, Sayyid Hamad was personal adviser to Sultan Qaboos.

Education 
Sayyid Badr received his early education in the Saideyya schools between Muscat and Salalah. He left for the United Kingdom in 1977 to pursue his further education, and he spent his first months in Wales with a private tutor. He relocated to London in spring 1978 and worked with a team of tutors for three years. This experience enabled Sayyid Badr to gain the necessary grades in the British Secondary School Examinations to win a place at the University of Oxford, where he was awarded an M.Litt in Politics, Philosophy and Economics (PPE) in 1986.

Marriage 
In 1979 Sayyid Badr married Noora bint Abdullah bin Mahawish Al Daher, formerly a Saudi Arabian but now an Omani national. The marriage ended in divorce in 1993. Their children are:

 Sayyid Nasr bin Badr bin Hamad Albusaidi.
 Sayyida Asila bint Badr bin Hamad Albusaidi.
 Sayyida Salsabeel bint Badr bin Hamad Albusaidi.
 Sayyida Mazan bint Badr bin Hamad Albusaidi.

Diplomatic career 

Following Sayyid Badr’s return to Muscat 1988, he joined the Foreign Ministry as a diplomat. In 1989 he was appointed as the first secretary, and he established the Office of Political Analysis to provide systematic assessment and policy analysis of key international and regional issues. In 1990 he was promoted to councillor, and in 1996 he was promoted to ambassador. In 1997 Badr was appointed the head of the Minister's Office Department. In 2000 he was promoted to undersecretary, and then became Secretary General of the Foreign Ministry in 2007. Sayyid Badr was appointed Foreign Minister on 18 August 2020.

Sayyid Badr led the initial negotiation with the United States concerning labour law issues, which began in 1993 and subsequently led to Omani membership of the World Trade Organisation in 2000, and to a US Omani Free Trade Agreement in 2006.

He has also chaired the Omani side in many bilateral and multilateral meetings regionally and internationally.

Sayyid Badr has lectured in Oman and internationally on topics such as cultural dialogue, modernisation and development, and the writing of Omani history. He takes a keen personal interest in youth development, human rights and the advancement of women in public life, and he promotes cultural diplomacy, tolerance and mutual understanding.

Institutional affiliation 
 MEDRC Oman representative and Chairman of Executive Council (1996–present)

References

External links 
 Omani Foreign Ministry

Al Said dynasty
1960 births
Living people
Omani diplomats
Foreign ministers of Oman
People from Muscat, Oman